William de Brus, 3rd Lord of Annandale (died 16 July 1212), was the second but eldest surviving son of Robert de Brus, 2nd Lord of Annandale.

His elder brother, Robert III de Brus, predeceased their father, never holding the lordship of Annandale. William de Brus thus succeeded his father when the latter died in 1194.

William de Brus possessed large estates in the north of England. He obtained from John, King of England, the grant of a weekly market at Hartlepool, and granted lands to the canons of Gisburn. Very little else is known about William's activities. He makes a few appearances in the English government records and witnessed a charter of William the Lion, King of Scotland.

He married Christina, daughter of Uhtred of Galloway, and had by her three sons:
Robert de Brus, Lord of Annandale (died 1226), married Isobel of Huntingdon, had issue.
John de Brus
William de Brus

William de Brus died on 16 July 1212 and was survived by his wife Christina who went on to remarry as his second wife Patrick I, Earl of Dunbar.

Notes

References
 Burke, Messrs., John and John Bernard, The Royal Families of England, Scotland, and Wales, with Their Descendants, &c., London, 1848: vol.1, pedigree XXXIV.
 Northcliffe, Charles B., of Langon, MA., editor, The Visitation of Yorkshire, 1563/4 by William Flower, Norroy King of Arms, London, 1881, p. 40.
 Duncan, A. A. M., ‘Brus , Robert (II) de, lord of Annandale (d. 1194?)’, in Oxford Dictionary of National Biography, Oxford University Press, 2004

Year of birth uncertain
1212 deaths
William
Scoto-Normans
Lords of Annandale